Last Ones Left is a collaborative mixtape by American rappers 42 Dugg and EST Gee, released April 8, 2022, by Collective Music Group, Warlike, and Interscope Records.

Style and reception 

AllMusic wrote that the project "emphasizes the duo's unlikely complementary chemistry, with EST Gee's growl playing off of Dugg's tinny, relentless flows", with "highlights happen[ing] when the rappers hit a collective stride" such as Gee "sounding directly inspired by Dugg's verses" on "Thump Shit". The mixtape's final five tracks, which "showcase individual tracks and even some solo material from other artists EST Gee and 42 Dugg are affiliated with", end up "feeling more like a compilation and taking away somewhat from the impact of the rest of the tape", but the project's "strongest moments ... capture the intensity and power that happen when these two creative forces reveal they're more similar than they might first appear." HipHopDXs Matthew Ritchie says the duo's "proximity-based partnership produces natural chemistry, avoiding the pitfalls of cheap collaborative albums such as Lil Durk and Lil Baby's Voice of the Heroes" and "even as the tone gets old after 17 tracks, the tape goes hard for a commercial project." The project's "production styles feel distinct enough to make it seem like Dugg and EST Gee can run their relay race on any background", such as "the electronic keyboard clashing with the pounding bass" on "Thump Shit", the "NBA YoungBoy-inspired" "Free the Shiners", and the "unmistakable piano crashes of Enrgy Beats on "Everybody Shooters Too". Whether the project stands the test of time, "Gee and Dugg have mercifully raised the bar for star rapper collabs."

Pitchforks Alphonse Pierre agrees, saying "Dugg and Gee complement each other well enough: They're both hugely influenced by rap scenes in the South and Midwest, and they both tell hardened drug-dealing stories that blur the lines between reality and myth" and that the "highlights are the tracks where their verses weave together to the point that they feel like one", such as on "Ice Talk" where "Dugg and Gee are in complete sync, building off each other's last lines every time they pass the mic." Pierre concludes by saying "Even if 42 Dugg and EST Gee aren't the most organic duo, it's hard not to have fun with two scorching-hot rappers going toe-to-toe." HotNewHipHops Aron A. notes "a sweet spot between the guttural sounds of Louisville and the icy production of Detroit that ties together through a mutual understanding of a universal code of the streets", and also suggests you "have to applaud the sentiment" behind Dugg and Gee including posse cuts such as "Whole Gang Buss" and "Free Zoski" despite them "tak[ing] away from the central focus of Dugg and Gee's irresistible rapport as collaborators."

Year-end lists

Track listing

References 

2022 mixtape albums
42 Dugg albums
Collaborative albums
Interscope Records albums
Collective Music Group albums
Hip hop albums by American artists